Messier 50 or M 50, also known as NGC 2323, is an open cluster of stars in the constellation Monoceros. It was recorded by G. D. Cassini before 1711 and independently discovered by Charles Messier in 1772 while observing Biela's Comet. It is sometimes described as a 'heart-shaped' figure or a blunt arrowhead.

M50 is about 2,900 light-years away from Earth and is near to but narrowly not estimated to be gravitationally tied to the Canis Major (CMa) OB1 association. It is around 140 million years old, with two high-mass white dwarfs and two chemically peculiar stars.

Gallery

See also
 List of Messier objects

References and footnotes

External links

 Messier 50 - at Deep Sky Videos
 Messier 50, SEDS Messier pages
 M50 Image by Waid Observatory
 

Messier 050
Orion–Cygnus Arm
Messier 050
050
Messier 050
?